Felix Halfon (born 7 April 1972) is an Israeli footballer.

Drug smuggling conviction
In August 2003 Halfon was caught smuggling cocaine in the Ben Gurion International Airport. In 2004 Felix was sentenced for 4.5 years in prison but was released in June 2006 after 2.5 years for good behavior.

Honours
State Cup (1):
1999
Liga Gimel (Sharon) (1):
2011-12

References

External links

1972 births
Living people
Israeli Jews
Israeli footballers
Hapoel Tel Aviv F.C. players
Israel international footballers
Hapoel Haifa F.C. players
Maccabi Tel Aviv F.C. players
Beitar Jerusalem F.C. players
Beitar Be'er Sheva F.C. players
Bnei Yehuda Tel Aviv F.C. players
Hapoel Rishon LeZion F.C. players
Maccabi Ironi Bat Yam F.C. players
Hapoel Kfar Shalem F.C. players
Hapoel Bat Yam F.C. players
Israeli prisoners and detainees
People convicted of drug offenses
Israel under-21 international footballers
Liga Leumit players
Israeli Premier League players
Footballers from Bat Yam
Israeli people of Libyan-Jewish descent
Association football defenders